Chrysops excitans is a species of deer fly in the family Tabanidae.

Distribution
Canada, United States.

References

Tabanidae
Insects described in 1850
Diptera of North America
Taxa named by Francis Walker (entomologist)